Hiland is a given name. Notable people with the given name include:

Hiland Hall (1795–1885), American lawyer and politician
Hiland R. Hulburd (1829–1880), American government official
Hiland J. Spaulding (1841–1927), American politician and businessman
Hiland Orlando Stickney (1867–1911), American football player and coach

See also
 Hiland (disambiguation)